Edward Morley (7 February 1873 – 5 June 1929) was an Australian politician.

He was born in Malmsbury, Victoria to quarryman George Morley and Mary Cahill. He was a storekeeper at Sorrento and then Numurkah before becoming an estate agent in Temora (New South Wales) and Melbourne. Around 1896 he married Maggie Emmerson, with whom he had a son. During World War I he was a captain in the Australian Imperial Force, and was wounded and invalided home. In 1920 he was elected to the Victorian Legislative Assembly for Barwon as an independent Nationalist, but he was an official Nationalist from 1921. He was Assistant Minister of Public Works from 1928 until his death in Brighton in 1929.

References

1873 births
1929 deaths
Independent members of the Parliament of Victoria
Nationalist Party of Australia members of the Parliament of Victoria
Members of the Victorian Legislative Assembly